The Anglesey Oyster and Welsh Produce Festival is an annual food festival that was established in 2006 and is held during October in Anglesey, Wales.

Overview

The festival started as an informal social event based on the consumption of oysters, drinking and dancing and was formalised into a food festival in 2006 when it was also expanded to include other types of food.

Focus

The original focus of the festival was originally seafood, in particular local oyster production which is organised around the fast-flowing waters of the Menai Strait. The festival has since expanded to include other food types from local producers. Many of the producers are local farmers and fishermen who produce beef, lamb, lobsters and oysters. Some of these producers have diversified into producing cheese, chocolate and real ale. The festival has been described as "a friendly food fair giving visitors the opportunity to meet and build relationships with over 40 producers". 

The festival has included cookery demonstrations, talks from producers, recipe ideas, cookery tips and competitions, including a sausage competition, and a Music and Mussels event. The event has also organised a black tie gala dinner and entertainment has included Welsh and Irish dancing. There is an entertainment marquee.

Structure and support

The festival is supported by volunteers and organised by a limited company, Anglesey Oyster & Shellfish Festival Ltd. The festival has also received Welsh Government support.

Location

The festival is located at Trearddur and takes place at the Trearddur Bay Hotel, Lon Isallt, Trearddur Bay, Anglesey, LL65 2UN. 

The festival has around 3,000 visitors and there is an entry fee.

Further reading

Business Wales, Food and Drink

About Wales, Welsh Food Festivals

References 

Food and drink festivals in the United Kingdom
Anglesey
Annual events in Wales
1998 establishments in Wales
Recurring events established in 1998
Autumn events in Wales